Henk Nijboer (born 31 March 1983) is a Dutch politician. As a member of the Labour Party (Partij van de Arbeid) he has been an MP since 20 September 2012. Previously he was a member of the provincial parliament of the province of Groningen from 2003 to 2007.

References

External links 
 
  Henk Nijboer at the website of the Labour Party
  Henk Nijboer at the website of the House of Representatives

1983 births
Living people
21st-century Dutch civil servants
21st-century Dutch economists
21st-century Dutch politicians
Gay politicians
Labour Party (Netherlands) politicians
LGBT members of the Parliament of the Netherlands
Members of the House of Representatives (Netherlands)
Members of the Provincial Council of Groningen
Politicians from Groningen (city)
University of Groningen alumni
20th-century Dutch people